The CASA III was a 1920s Spanish two-seat monoplane, designed by Luis Sousa Peco and built by Construcciones Aeronáuticas SA (CASA) at Getafe near Madrid.

Design and development
In 1929 using experience from the production of licence-built aircraft the company built the CASA III. It was originally designed as a light bomber monoplane for the Aeronáutica Naval air arm of the Spanish Navy, but since its performance was poor the prototypes were used as touring aircraft, ending up as trainers at Pollensa´s Naval Air School.

The CASA III was a parasol wing monoplane with a fabric-covered steel tube fuselage. It had two tandem open cockpits and wide track fixed conventional landing gear with a tail skid. The wings were hinged at the rear spar and they could be folded for storage or transport.

The M-CAGG registered prototype first flew on 2 July 1929 and was powered by a  Cirrus III piston engine. Within a few weeks the aircraft took part in a handicap air race between Madrid and Burgos and on 25 December 1929 it became the first light aircraft to land in the Canary Islands. The second aircraft was fitted with a  Isotta Fraschini Asso 80A engine but it was not a success. In 1930 three CASA III aircraft entered the 1930 Aerial Tour of Europe, but only two actually competed; the prototype which retired with a broken landing gear, and the de Havilland Gipsy I powered third-aircraft (M-CMAM) which arrived too late for the start although it completed the course. A total of nine aircraft were built, all with different engines, including the de Havilland Gipsy III and the Elizalde A6 radial engine. The last aircraft built was delivered to the Spanish Navy.

Suitable power plants included:- de Havilland Gipsy I, de Havilland Gipsy II, de Havilland Gipsy III, Isotta Fraschini Asso 80 R., Lorraine 5P, Walter Venus and Elizalde D V.

Operational history
During the Spanish Civil War all the remaining CASA IIIs were operated by the Republican forces and none of them survived.

Operators
 (Kingdom)
Aeronáutica Naval

 Spanish Republican Air Force

Specifications (Gipsy I-powered)

See also

References

Further reading

1920s Spanish military aircraft
III
Parasol-wing aircraft
Single-engined tractor aircraft
Aircraft first flown in 1929